Mr. Wonderful is a 1993 American romantic comedy film directed by Academy Award-winning director Anthony Minghella.

The film stars Matt Dillon, Annabella Sciorra, Mary-Louise Parker, William Hurt and Vincent D'Onofrio.

Plot

Gus DeMarco, an electrician, wants to purchase a bowling alley with his friends. The problem is that he still pays alimony to his ex-wife, Leonora. Gus realizes that if Leonora remarries, he can stop paying alimony, and attempts to match Leonora with various men.

Lenora has several would-be suitors, including one who upsets her because he is pushy, so she goes to complain to Gus about it. Afterwards, she has him to dinner. As he is leaving, her professor boyfriend Tom shows up directly after, upsetting Gus.

In the course of his match-making, Gus' girlfriend, Rita breaks up with him on the day they were meant to move in together. She feels he's still in love with his ex. One day, his workmate describes to him how being in love makes him feel. It inspires him to find Leonora but, seeing her in the botanical garden with Dominic stops him in his tracks.

A while later, on a job, Gus gets electrocuted while saving a workmate. Leonora, similarly to him, realizes she still has feelings for him when she sees him in the hospital. Rita, as she works there, is at his sleeping side, so Leonora leaves without talking to him. Once he's out, she visits him at his apartment. She had ended things with the professor, and she lets  him know Dominic asked her to marry him.

In the end, Gus and Leonora discover that they still care about each other.

Cast

Reception

Critical reception
The film received mixed reviews. It holds a 52% rating on Rotten Tomatoes based on 21 reviews, with an average rating of 5.8/10. Audiences polled by CinemaScore gave the film an average grade of "B" on an A+ to F scale.

Box office
The film was not a box office success.

References

External links
 
 
 

1993 films
1993 romantic comedy films
American romantic comedy films
Films directed by Anthony Minghella
Films shot in New York City
Warner Bros. films
Touchstone Pictures films
The Samuel Goldwyn Company films
1990s English-language films
1990s American films